Chamm ol Hamid (also Romanized as Chamm ol Ḩamīd and Cham ol Ḩamīd) is a village in Shoaybiyeh-ye Sharqi Rural District, Shadravan District, Shushtar County, Khuzestan Province, Iran. At the 2006 census, its population was 666, in 91 families.

References 

Populated places in Shushtar County